Jackson Beckham Diego Socrates da Silva de Jesus (born December 6, 1994) is a Brazilian footballer.

Career
Jackson Beckham spent several years with Italian side ACF Fiorentina, where he was under a youth contract with the Serie A side from 2007 to 2010 before earning a professional contract for 2010–2013. He signed with third-tier American club Dayton Dutch Lions in March 2014.

References

External links
 Dayton Dutch Lions profile

1994 births
Living people
Brazilian footballers
ACF Fiorentina players
Dayton Dutch Lions players
USL Championship players
Association football forwards
Association football midfielders